Constictic acid is a chemical compound of the depsidone class.  It was first isolated in 1968 from lichen of the genus Usnea.  It has since been found in many other lichen genera including Menegazzia, Crespoa, and Xanthoparmelia.

References

Lactones
Benzaldehydes
Heterocyclic compounds with 4 rings
Phenols
Methoxy compounds
Benzodioxepines
Lichen products